Louise Baker may refer to:
M. Louise Baker, American archaeological illustrator
Louise Baker, character in Almost Normal
Louise Baker, see Custody battle for Anna Mae He